Birgit Dieckmann, known professionally as Billie Ray Martin, is a German singer and songwriter, known for her single "Your Loving Arms", which reached the top 10 of both the UK Singles Chart (#6) and the Irish Singles Chart (#8) in 1995, and reached number one on the US Dance Club Chart. She was also one of the vocalists on the S'Express UK top 10 hit single "Hey Music Lover" (1989), and had UK top 40 hits as lead vocalist of Electribe 101 with "Tell Me When the Fever Ended" (1989) and "Talking with Myself" (1990), and as a solo singer with "Running Around Town" (1995) and "Imitation of Life" (1996).

Early life 
Born in Hamburg, West Germany, she grew up near Reeperbahn, St. Pauli, in the city's red-light district. She lived with her working-class grandparents, who exposed her to Elvis Presley and German schlager music.

Career

Career beginnings 
In the early 1980s, Billie Ray Martin moved to Berlin. It was the time of electronic bands like Cabaret Voltaire, Throbbing Gristle and the early Human League, shaping Martin's conceptions of music. Simultaneously, she encountered the soul music of Martha Reeves and the Vandellas, Aretha Franklin and the Motown revival. In Berlin, she formed an eleven piece soul and sixties inspired band called Billie and the Deep. Their live shows became very popular in Berlin in 1985–86.

After these experiences, Billie Ray Martin moved to London, where she placed an ad in Melody Maker reading "soul rebel seeks musical genius". The ad led to a meeting with four men from Birmingham who had been looking for a voice to add to their music, resulting in the formation of Electribe 101. The band returned to Birmingham, where they recorded their first song, entitled "Talking with Myself", releasing it as a 12" single on their own Hipnotic label. It was noticed by manager Tom Watkins (who managed Pet Shop Boys, Bros and East 17). Electribe 101 signed with Watkins, and his label Phonogram Records.

Meanwhile, Billie Ray Martin had met DJ Mark Moore who invited her to the studio to work with his band S'Express. Martin contributed to three songs on their debut album Original Soundtrack: "Pimps, Pushers and Prostitutes", "L'Age du Gateau" and "Hey Music Lover" (retitled 'Music Lover' in the US). The latter became the third S'Express single, and a top 10 UK hit (reaching #6), giving Martin her first Top of the Pops appearance. She traveled across Europe with the group for a number of TV appearances in support of the single.

Electribe 101's first single with Phonogram was "Tell Me When the Fever Ended" released in November 1989, reaching No. 32 on the UK charts, and No. 23 on the Billboard Dance charts. "Talking with Myself" was re-released in February 1990 with a Frankie Knuckles mix and became a hit reaching No. 23 in the UK and No. 8 on the Billboard Dance charts. DJ and producer Marshall Jefferson refused to remix it as he felt it was "already perfect". "Talking with Myself" remains a club classic and has appeared on countless Ibiza and chill-out compilations over the past 22 years. "Talking with Myself" was re-mixed in 1998 and reached No. 39 in the UK charts.

Billie Ray Martin appeared on the cover of i-D Magazine, as well as weekly music/pop periodicals such as: NME, Melody Maker, Smash Hits, Record Mirror and Number One. NME described her style as looking like 'Cilla Black on Acid' when she made her first Top of the Pops appearance. A connection with Steve Nieve led to her being a guest vocalist with house band Steve Nieve and The Playboys, singing "Stay With Me" and "Chain of Fools", on the Channel X UK television series The Last Resort with Jonathan Ross.

Electribe 101's third single was entitled "You’re Walking" and reached No. 50 on the UK charts, prior to the release of their debut album Electribal Memories. A live concert at London's The Town & Country Club (now The London Forum) was televised on ITV to coincide with the album's release. They also played at the Milton Keynes Bowl in support to Erasure. Electribe 101 were then selected as the supporting act for the European leg of Depeche Mode’s 'World Violation' tour, including several nights at both the Birmingham NEC and Wembley Arena. A fourth single was released – a cover of the Jesse Rae song "Inside Out", the video of which was filmed in Paris.

The band then set to work on their second album, with a provisional title of Electronic Soul. However, conflict with Watkins and Phonogram led to the album not being released. While seeking another label, the band broke up.

Solo:  1993–2002 

BRM's debut solo release was at the end of 1993 in collaboration with the British dance duo Spooky on a cover of the Throbbing Gristle song 'Persuasion'. Her second release was the 'Four Ambient Tales' EP with Dave Ball and Richard Norris of The Grid. She made an appearance on The Jonathan Ross Show, performing a cover of Ann Peebles’ "I’m Gonna Tear Your Playhouse Down" with Slash from Guns N’Roses on guitar.

With a new set of songs, she signed with East West Records, a subsidiary of Warner Music. In the US, Martin was signed to Seymour Stein’s Sire Records. The first release with her new label was "Your Loving Arms" again with Dave Ball and Richard Norris of The Grid on production. The track reached No. 38 in November 1994. On a subsequent re-release the song peaked at No. 6 in the UK Singles Chart in May 1995, Martin once again appearing on Top of the Pops as well as various UK and European TV shows in support of the song. Further mixes by Todd Terry and Brothers in Rhythm helped the song reach No. 1. It also topped the Hot Dance Music/Club Play chart and eventually reached the top 50 of the Billboard Hot 100 and the top 20 of Radio & Records magazine's CHR/Pop airplay chart (ranking #76 on the 1996 year-end chart).

In February 1995, the Junior Vasquez mix of "True Moments Of My World" was being played in clubs, but was not released as her next single. Instead, "Running Around Town" was chosen and reached No. 29 in the UK, as well as hitting No. 1 on the club charts. Her solo album entitled Deadline For My Memories was planned for an Autumn release, but was delayed until 1996. It included several songs originally destined for Electribe 101's second album. The album was preceded by extensive press coverage including a number of magazine cover stories. Martin also guested on BBC Two's ...Later with Jools Holland performing two songs from the album: "Hands Up And Amen" and "I Don't Believe". The album was preceded by a third single, "Imitation Of Life", which reached No. 29. A video for the single was filmed in the docks and bars of Hamburg and featured members of Billie's family and friends. Deadline for My Memories was released at the end of January. Two further singles were released from the album: "Space Oasis", and the ballad, "You And I (Keep Holding On)". TV appearances continued, including a live MTV performance from Turkey.

Meanwhile, Martin continued to write songs for a projected second album, but left the Warner label and moved to New York, where she wrote with dance music producer, Fred Jorio. She signed with React Music Limited in the UK, and released the single, "Honey". The song hit No. 1 in the club charts but poor performance on the UK singles chart caused the cancellation of a planned second release. "Honey" debuted stateside courtesy of Nervous Records four years later. The song peaked at No. 1 on the Hot Dance Music/Club Play charts.  During this time, she also recorded an album of soul and blues songs with the Jon Tiven Group in New York, but this album remains unreleased. A single and an EP of her drum and bass recordings were released by NY label Finetune recordings. The single was "Pacemaker" while the EP was entitled "Crime & Punishment".

In 2000, Martin travelled to Memphis, Tennessee to record her next album at the House of Blues studio. Her band was led by Marvell Thomas, son of Rufus Thomas, and featured members of Aretha Franklin’s own band. Ann Peebles and Carla Thomas provided backing vocals, while Peebles did a duet with Martin on the album's title track "Eighteen Carat Garbage". The album 18 Carat Garbage was released on Martin's own Sonnenstahl Records label. Four 12" singles on vinyl were initially released from the album: "Systems Of Silence" was released on 2 January 2001 followed by "18 Carat Garbage" on 16 January 2001 and then "I've Never Been To Memphis" in March 2001 and the Motown inspired "Where Fools Rush In" in September 2001. In 2002, Sonnenstahl Records released the 12-track CD Recycled Garbage, a compilation of remixes of selected tracks from 18 Carat Garbage.

Solo: 2003–current 

In 2003, Martin released a series of singles on her new Disco Activisto label, including the electronic music club hits "No Brakes on My Rollerskates" and "Dead Again". In 2005–06 she released collaborations with DJ Hell and Slam. The song "Je Regrette Everything" (written by Billie and Mikael Delta) appeared on DJ Hell's album NY Muscle (Universal Music).  DJ Hell said of Martin "she's one of the living legends in modern music history and one of the best voices on planet earth". "Bright Lights Fading" appeared on Slam's Year Zero album. Both this and "Je Regrette Everything" were subsequently released as singles. The Moroder-influenced solo single "Undisco Me" was released on Rebirth Records in April 2007, and reached No. 6 in the UK Dance Chart. Martin also began a second career as a disc jockey launching her own clubnight Komputerliebe in London and then Frankfurt.

In 2008, Martin formed a new band, The Opiates, with Robert Solheim producing. The Opiates made their live debut at Rough Trade, Brick Lane, London, in March, to coincide with the group's first release, the Anatomy of a Plastic Girl EP. In 2010, she released The Crackdown Project featuring her takes on the Cabaret Voltaire classic album, The Crackdown. 2011 began with the solo single "Sweet Suburban Disco". She corroborated with Hard Ton on the Sold Life EP, featuring a new song "Sold Life" and a cover of the Pierre's Pfantasy Club classic, "Fantasy Girl".

A second EP from The Opiates, titled Rainy Days and Remixes, was released in September 2011 as a prelude to their album Hollywood Under The Knife. A short UK tour including a performance at HMV on Oxford Street, London launched the album, which was packaged in imagery by Turner Prize winner Wolfgang Tillmans. The album got a four star review in Metro. In February 2012, a remix collection entitled Hollywood Cuts was released.

2012 saw the release of a series of collaborations including "Make Me Feel" on Terranova's Hotel Amour album, and "Hyper Lust" on the new album from Motor. In September, Martin released a limited edition DVD entitled Five Takes (A Song About Andy), featuring five movies inspired by Andy Warhol‘s Screen Tests. The song "On Borrowed Time" is presented in five unique takes, with music by electronic producer and soul singer, Waterson.

On February 3, 2023, it was announced via Mary Wilson's Facebook page that Soul Defender, written by Martin, would be released on March 3, 2023, which would have been Wilson's 79th birthday.

Discography

 Deadline for My Memories (1996)
 Recycled Garbage (2002)
 BRM New Demos (2003)

See also
 List of number-one dance hits (United States)
 List of artists who reached number one on the US Dance chart

References

External links
 
 
 

Living people
British house musicians
German dance musicians
German expatriates in England
Sire Records artists
Women in electronic music
21st-century British women singers
21st-century German women singers
Year of birth missing (living people)